Lolo can refer to:

Places

United States
 Lolo, Montana, a census-designated place
 Lolo Butte, a summit in Oregon
 Lolo Pass (Idaho–Montana)
 Lolo Pass (Oregon)
 Lolo National Forest, Montana
 Lolo Peak, Montana

Elsewhere
 Lolo, Cameroon,  a village in East Region, Cameroon
 Mount Lolo, near Kamloops, British Columbia, Canada
 Mount Lolo (Quadra Island), British Columbia, Canada
 Lolo River, Gabon
 Lolo, Iran, a village in Khuzestan Province
 Lolo, Kerman, a village in Kerman Province, Iran

People
 Lolo (given name), a list of people
 Lolo (surname), a list of people
 Lolo people, or Yi, in China
 Loló (footballer, born 1981) (Lourenço Tomás Cuxixima), Angolan footballer
 Lolo (footballer, born 1984) (Manuel Jesús Ortiz Toribio), Spanish footballer
 Lolo (footballer, born 1993) (Manuel Coronado Plá), Spanish footballer
 Lolo (singer), American singer-songwriter and actress Lauren Pritchard
 LØLØ, Canadian pop singer

Entertainment
 Lolo (film), a 2015 French comedy
 Scamper the Penguin (in the film The Adventures of Scamper the Penguin), known as "Lolo" outside the United States
 A blue ball-like character from the Eggerland series games
 Lolo (Klonoa character), from the Klonoa video game series
 The playing character of Adventures of Lolo, a 1989 NES game

Other uses
 Lift-on/lift-off (LoLo) ships
 Lower Lower Manhattan (LoLo), a proposal for Lower Manhattan expansion
 Lolo, a donkey "painter", the fictitious Italian painter Joachim-Raphaël Boronali
 Lolo (Lo Loestrin), a brand of ethinylestradiol/norethisterone acetate
 Lolo, a subdialect of the Makhuwa language of Mozambique
 Roman Catholic Diocese of Lolo, Democratic Republic of the Congo
 any of several Loloish languages of China and Tibet
 Lowrider, a type of car

See also
 Lolo ball
 Iolo, a Welsh given name